The Argentine Sea is a marginal sea of the Atlantic Ocean adjacent to the southern tip of South America. It ranges from the mouth of the estuary of the Río de la Plata in the north (35th parallel south) to the Isla de los Estados in the south, and from the Argentine coast to the 200 meters isobath. Its width varies between 210 km in front of Mar del Plata and 850 km at the latitude of the Falkland Islands. The coastline extends for 4,725 km. To the east of the Argentine Sea extends much deeper and more extensive Argentine Basin.

Geography
It has a salinity of 3.5%.

The Argentine Sea progressively widens going southward, in contrast to the narrowing of the continental mass. The sea platform has a series of plateaux which descend to the east as large terraces or steps. Because of its stair-shaped plateaux, the Argentine Sea is similar morphologically to the Extra-Andean Patagonia. The Falkland Islands are also located within the continental shelf of the Argentine Sea.

Territorial claims
According to the law 23968, the territorial waters of Argentina extend  from the line from the gulfs of San Matías and San Jorge to the outer limits of the River Plate. The contiguous zone extends 12 nautical miles after the territorial waters, and the exclusive economic zone  from it. The continental shelf extends to either the limits of the exclusive economic zone or the shelf slope. Argentina has signed and ratified the United Nations Convention on the Law of the Sea.

The exclusive economic zone claimed by Argentina overlap with claims maintained by the United Kingdom around the Falkland Islands and similar claims around South Georgia and the South Sandwich Islands. The UK's Falkland Islands claim boundary starts from the midpoint between Argentina and the Islands to the West and stretches 200 nautical miles in other directions with similar claims around the other British Overseas Territories.

Argentina announced its claim without consultation with the United Kingdom. In the years 1990 to 2005 fishing and mineral resources in the area were administered by joint commissions between Argentina and the United Kingdom, Argentina unilaterally withdrew from these organisations in 2005 to pursue a more aggressive stance in its claim to the Falkland Islands. At any one time Argentina usually has a single vessel patrolling the undisputed area of its claim, the vessels do not enter the exclusive economic zone of the United Kingdom although there have been reports of Argentine warships threatening vessels on the Falkland side of the border by radio.

Under the terms of the United Nations Convention on the Law of the Sea Article 59 disputed and overlapping claims have no legal force until the dispute is resolved between the opposing parties.

Biodiversity
The Argentine sea is one of the most temperate seas of the world. It receives the cold Falkland Current from the south, which comes from the Antarctic, and the warm Brazil Current from the north.

The Argentine sea has twelve areas identified as places of great biodiversity. There are two international protected areas, one national, and eighteen provincial ones.

The Argentine sea has plankton, algae, crustaceans, sardines and anchovies. Those feed the more advanced fauna such as penguins, cormorants, sharks, whales, dolphins, Burmeister's porpoise, fur seals, sea lions, and southern elephant seals.

See also
 Scotia Sea
 Strait of Magellan

References 

Bodies of water of Argentina
Seas of the Atlantic Ocean